Theatre Parade was a British television programme, one of the world's very first regular series, broadcast by the BBC Television Service from its inception during 1936 until 1938. The programme presented excerpts from popular London theatre productions of the time performed by the theatre cast from the BBC's studios at Alexandra Palace.

Among the productions (by George More O'Ferrall) included in the strand were the first ever television presentations of Lewis Carroll's works Alice Through the Looking-Glass (a twenty-five-minute excerpt, transmitted on 22 January 1937) and Alice in Wonderland (29 April, 1 May and 26 December 1937). The very first television adaptation of an Agatha Christie story was a production in this series with two transmissions of Wasp's Nest on 18 June 1937. As with all television programmes of the time, the shows were performed live, and no visual record other than still photographs now exist.

References
Vahimagi, Tise. British Television: An Illustrated Guide. Oxford. Oxford University Press / British Film Institute. 1994. .

External links

1936 British television series debuts
1938 British television series endings
1930s British television series
BBC Television shows
Lost BBC episodes